Luca Mancuso (born September 21, 2001) is an American soccer player who plays as a goalkeeper for New York University.

Career
Mancuso came up through the Weston FC U.S. Soccer Development Academy, starting with their U13/14 side for the 2015–16 season. In February 2019, he joined Orlando City B for the inaugural season of USL League One, making his professional debut on March 30, 2019 in a season-opening 3–1 defeat to FC Tucson. He made one appearance and was released at the end of the season.

References

External links 
 
 NYU bio

2001 births
Living people
American soccer players
Association football goalkeepers
Orlando City B players
USL League One players
Sportspeople from Miami Beach, Florida
Soccer players from Florida
NYU Violets men's soccer players